Dhyānabhadra (also known as Sunyadisya, Chi-Gong and Zhikong Chanxian) (1289–1363 C.E.) was an Indian Buddhist monk and translator. He taught first in China but later came to teach in Korea towards the end of the Goryeo dynasty. He was affiliated with esoteric schools of Buddhism.

Sources

Much of what we know about Dhyanabhadra come from a collection of primary sources from both China and Korea. These include: 

Record of Chan Essentials by the Monk Zhikong (Chanyao lu)
Zhikong’s Travel Record (Xinglu)
Zhikong’s Text of the Precepts of (Neither Arising Nor) Non-arising (Wushengjie Jing)

Life

Korean sources including the writings of Yi Saek detail that Dhyānabhadra was born as the third son of a minor chief in Magadha in 1289 C.E. At the age of eight, he enrolled at Nalanda monastery where he studied under the guidance of the Mahayana teacher Vinayabhadra who encouraged him to travel abroad including to Sri Lanka. In 1324, he travelled to Tibet and from there he arrived in Korea. During his time there, he founded the Hwaeomsa Temple in 1328 which modelled on Nalanda. A stupa inscription claims that he died in China in 1366 C.E.
During his time travelling through China and Korea, it was suggested that he had a role in instigating revolts against the ruling Mongols. 10 years following his death, and after the Mongols had been overthrown from Korea, his disciples erected a stupa on top of his remains. Much of what we know about him comes from the poetic inscription left on his stupa.

He was so revered in Korea that after he died in 1363, King Gongmin of Goryeo had his relics brought back to the country where they were first placed in the royal palace and later placed at the Hoemsa temple.

See also
 Hyecho
 Marananta
 Silk Road transmission of Buddhism
 Wang ocheonchukguk jeon

References

Monks of Nalanda
14th-century Buddhist monks